Student Day is the anniversary of the Student Independence Movement against the Japanese rule of Korea. It occurred in 1929, in the city of Gwangju.

In 1953, the National Assembly of South Korea announced the establishment of "Student Day" as a national holiday, celebrated annually on 3 November. In 2006, the holiday's name was changed to Student Independence Movement Day.

See also 
 Korean independence movement
 Gwangju Student Independence Movement
 Gwangbokjeol

References

Public holidays in South Korea